Gas Giants were a pop rock band from Tempe, Arizona, formed as a successor project to the Gin Blossoms. The group was known as The Pharaohs when they formed in 1997, but changed their name after their label, A&M Records, merged with Universal Records and the band changed hands, re-signing with Interscope Records. Eventually, the group released their album, From Beyond the Back Burner, in 1999 on indie Atomic Pop Records. Comic book artist Geof Darrow provided the artwork for the album. The band featured Gin Blossoms members Robin Wilson, Phillip Rhodes and Daniel Henzerling, as well as Mickey Ferrel, who was previously in the band Grievous Angels. Henzerling was the drummer for the Gin Blossoms before the current drummer, Phillip Rhodes. The band toured with Train in 2000 behind the band's only single, "Quitter".

Because the Gin Blossoms have reunited as of 2006, Gas Giants appear to be on indefinite hiatus.

Personnel
Robin Wilson – Lead Vocals, Guitar
Daniel Henzerling – Lead Guitar, Vocals
Phillip Rhodes – Drums, Vocals
Mickey Ferrell – Bass

Discography
From Beyond the Back Burner (1999, Atomic Pop Records)

Other appearance
Live in the X Lounge III – "Quitter" (live, 2000)
Boys and Girls (2000 film) soundtrack – "Quitter" (2000)
Gas Giants members were also featured on The Poppin' Wheelies (2000, Uranus Laboratories Inc.).  This was intended to be the soundtrack of an animated series (never produced) about a band in space.

References

1997 establishments in Arizona
American pop rock music groups
Gin Blossoms
Musical groups established in 1997
Musical groups from Tempe, Arizona
Musical quartets